The Memorial to the Holocaust of the Jewish People is an outdoor memorial dedicated to victims of the Holocaust.

The memorial is located at the junction of Rambla Presidente Wilson and Artigas Boulevard, in the Montevidean neighbourhood of Punta Carretas, on the shores of the River Plate, in Uruguay.

The memorial is around 120 metres long, and is mostly made of pink granite, with a central window looking out at the sea. A pair of railway rails are at the approach to the memorial, and the central part of the memorial has two wooden bridge crossings. It also includes several inscribed stele, including one signed by Elie Wiesel.

It was designed by Gastón Boero, Fernando Fabiano and Sylvia Perossio, with landscaping by Carlos Pellegrino. It opened in 1994.

Renovation 
Following several acts of anti-Semitic vandalism, the memorial was renovated, and rededicated in June 2016. Apart from cleaning the memorial of anti-Semitic graffiti, the renovations included the addition of lights and staircases. The renovation was funded by Uruguay's Jewish umbrella organization, the Israelite Central Committee. However, a year later, the memorial was again vandalized with anti-Semitic slurs.

See also

 List of Holocaust memorials and museums
 History of the Jews in Uruguay

References

Holocaust memorials
Jews and Judaism in Montevideo
Monuments and memorials in Montevideo
Punta Carretas
1994 sculptures
1994 establishments in Uruguay